Judy Boyle is an American politician 
from Idaho. A Republican, she is a member of Idaho House of Representatives for District 9 seat B. Boyle is the current chairman of Western Legislative Forestry Task Force (WLFTF).

Early life 
Boyle was born in Midvale, Idaho.

Education
Boyle has attended Lassen College, Boise State University, and the University of Idaho.

Career 
On May 27, 2008, Boyle won the Republican primary. Boyle defeated Diana Thomas with 53.4% of the votes. On November 4, 2008, Boyle won the election and became a Republican member of the Idaho House of Representatives for District 9 seat B. Boyle defeated Jennifer M. Morgan with 66.8% of the votes.

On May 25, 2010, Boyle was unopposed in the Republican primary. On November 2, 2010, as an incumbent, Boyle won the general election unopposed and continued serving District 9 seat B. On November 6, 2012, as an incumbent, Boyle won the election and continued serving District 9 seat B. Boyle defeated Mary Sue Roach with 65.2% of the votes. On November 4, 2014, as an incumbent, Boyle won the election unopposed and continued serving District 9 seat B. On November 8, 2016, as an incumbent, Boyle won the election and continued serving District 9 seat B. Boyle defeated Allen Schmidt with 73.2% of the votes.

In 2019, Boyle became the chairman of Western Legislative Forestry Task Force (WLFTF).

Boyle on November 18, 2020 announce that she will run against Mike Moyle for Idaho House of Representatives Majority Leader.

Political Activity 
In 2023, Boyle and Idaho Senator Tammy Nichols introduced HB 154, a bill that would make it a misdemeanor to provide or administer a vaccine developed using mRNA technology in any individual or mammal in the state. Such vaccines would include the COVID-19 vaccine and other vaccines in development that target RSV, some cancers, HIV, influenza, cystic fibrosis, and others.

Personal life 
Boyle has two children, Brian and Peggy. Boyle lives in Midvale, Idaho.

References

External links
Judy Boyle at the Idaho Legislature
 Judy Boyle at ballotpedia.org

Year of birth missing (living people)
Place of birth missing (living people)
Living people
Boise State University alumni
Republican Party members of the Idaho House of Representatives
People from Washington County, Idaho
University of Idaho alumni
Women state legislators in Idaho
21st-century American politicians
21st-century American women politicians